Skuta or Škuta is a surname. Notable people with the surname include:

 Dan Skuta (born 1986), American football player
 Mikuláš Škuta (born 1960), Slovak pianist and composer

See also